Thilo Versick (born 27 November 1985 in Minden) is a German former professional footballer who played as a forward. He made two appearances for Arminia Bielefeld in the Bundesliga.

References

External links 
 

1985 births
Living people
People from Minden
Sportspeople from Detmold (region)
German footballers
Footballers from North Rhine-Westphalia
Association football forwards
Bundesliga players
Arminia Bielefeld players